Dirkiesdorp is a village in Gert Sibande District Municipality in the Mpumalanga province of South Africa.

Education
There are only two recognised schools in Dirkiesdorp.

References

Populated places in the Mkhondo Local Municipality